The following is a list of all films shown at the 2014 Sundance Film Festival.

Feature competition

The following films were shown in competition at the 2014 Sundance Film Festival.

U.S. Documentary

The following 16 films were selected for a world premiere in U.S. Documentary Competition program. Dinosaur 13 by Todd Miller served as the opening film of the program.

U.S. Dramatic

The following 16 films were selected for a world premiere in U.S. Dramatic Competition program. Whiplash by Damien Chazelle served as the opening film of the program.

World Cinema Documentary

The following 12 films were selected for a world premiere in World Cinema Documentary Competition program. The Green Prince by Nadav Schirman served as the opening film of the program.

World Cinema Dramatic

The following 12 films were selected for a world premiere in World Cinema Dramatic Competition program. Lilting by Hong Khaou served as the opening film of the program.

Short Programs
The following 66 short films were selected from a record 8,161 submissions.

USA Narrative Short Films

International Narrative Short Films

Documentary Short Films

Animated Short Films

Non-competition features

The following films were shown out of competition at the 2014 Sundance Film Festival.

Premieres

The following 19 feature films were selected for a world premiere in non-Competition program.

Documentary premieres

The following 12 films were selected for Documentary Premieres program.

Spotlight

The following 8 films were selected for Spotlight program.

Next
The following 11 films were selected for a world premiere in Next program to highlight the American cinema.

Park City at Midnight

The following 8 films were selected for Park City at Midnight program.

From the Collection

The following 2 films were selected for From the Collection program.

New Frontier Films

The following 7 films were selected for New Frontier Films program.

Sundance Kids

The following 2 films were selected for Sundance Kids program.

Free Fail Film

The following film was shown at Free Fail Film program.

References

External links
 Sundance Film Festival Screening List at the Internet Movie Database

Sundance 2014
2014 films
Sundance films
Sundance films